The A.J. Lewis House is a historic mansion in Edwards, Mississippi, U.S.. It has been listed on the National Register of Historic Places since August 4, 1983.

History 
It was built between 1892 until 1895 for Alonzo James Lewis, a veteran of the Confederate States Army during the American Civil War who became a wealthy businessman after the war. It was designed in the Queen Anne architectural style, with "an arcaded double-tiered veranda."

References

Houses on the National Register of Historic Places in Mississippi
Queen Anne architecture in Mississippi
Houses completed in 1895
Houses in Hinds County, Mississippi